The 2000 World Field Archery Championships were held in Cortina d'Ampezzo, Italy.

Medal summary (Men's individual)

Medal summary (Women's individual)

Medal summary (Men's Team)

Medal summary (Women's Team)

Medal summary (Juniors)

References

E
2000 in Italian sport
International archery competitions hosted by Italy
World Field Archery Championships